On the Job may refer to:

On-the-job training
"On the Job" (CSI: NY), an episode of the TV series CSI: NY
On the Job (2013 film), a Filipino action film
On the Job (2021 miniseries), a Filipino HBO miniseries